Karim El Ouazghari El Boazzati (born 17 December 1979) is a Spanish former professional boxer who competed from 2006 to 2015. He held the Spanish lightweight title from 2010 to 2012, and challenged once for the EBU European lightweight title in 2011.

Professional career
Born in Spain to Moroccan parents, El Ouazghari made his professional debut on 6 October 2006, winning a four-round unanimous decision (UD) over Sento Martinez, who also debuted. On 2 April 2011, El Ouazghari fought for the European lightweight title against undefeated champion John Murray. In what was described as a "sluggish" and "laboured" performance by Murray, El Ouazghari went on to lose via UD but redeemed himself by putting up a tough fight. Further attempts to win regional titles resulted in losses to Serhiy Fedchenko on 20 April 2013 (UD), Kevin Mitchell on 14 December 2013 (ninth-round stoppage), Stephen Ormond on 4 April 2014 (fifth-round stoppage), and Artem Haroyan on 13 November 2015 (second-round stoppage).

Professional boxing record

References

External links

Spanish male boxers
Lightweight boxers
Light-welterweight boxers
1979 births
Boxers from Barcelona
Living people
Spanish sportspeople of Moroccan descent